Kevin John McKay (born 9 February 1969 in Manchester) is a male retired track and field athlete.

Athletics career
McKay represented Great Britain at the 1992 and 1996 Summer Olympics in the men's 1500 metres. He represented England in the 1,500 metres event, at the 1994 Commonwealth Games in Victoria, British Columbia, Canada. Four years later he represented England in the 1,500 metres event again, at the 1998 Commonwealth Games in Kuala Lumpur, Malaysia.

References

1969 births
Living people
British male middle-distance runners
Athletes (track and field) at the 1992 Summer Olympics
Athletes (track and field) at the 1996 Summer Olympics
Olympic athletes of Great Britain
Athletes (track and field) at the 1994 Commonwealth Games
Athletes (track and field) at the 1998 Commonwealth Games
Commonwealth Games competitors for England